Laas-dhankayre is a district of Somali Region in Ethiopia.

See also 

 Qoraxey Region Districts of Ethiopia

References 

Districts of Somali Region